Gyanendra Bahadur Karki (Nepali:ज्ञानेन्द्र बहादुर कार्की) is a Nepali politician from Nepali Congress. He is the former Minister for Information and Communications of Nepal. He was Finance Minister under Deuba cabinet, 2017. He has been elected as a House of Representative from constituency 4 of the Sunsari district in 2017 Nepalese legislative election.

Political life 
Karki, who was born in Bhojpur in 1957 AD, entered party politics through the Nepal Students Union. Karki, became the president of the Nepal Student's Union in 2039 BS succeeding former Deputy PM and NC Vice-president Bimalendra Nidhi in the post. Karki was a confidant of Krishna Prasad Bhattarai. Karki, who was earlier in charge of the Ministry of Water Resources and Finance, is now in charge of the Ministry of Law, Justice and Parliamentary Affairs.

Electoral history 
Gyanendra Bahadur Karki won the 2017 Nepalese General Election from Sunsari-4. Previously, he lost thrice from Bhojpur-1 and that too with few hundred votes which can be seen below. In 2013 Constituent Assembly election, Karki didn't contest the election and was made MP from Proportional list of Nepali Congress.

Election in the 2010s

2017 legislative elections

Election in the 2000s

2008 Constituent Assembly election

Election in the 1990s

1999 legislative elections

1994 legislative elections

References 

Living people
Nepali Congress politicians from Koshi Province
Finance ministers of Nepal
Government ministers of Nepal
1957 births
Nepal MPs 2017–2022
Members of the 2nd Nepalese Constituent Assembly
Nepali Congress (Democratic) politicians